Southern Bantoid (or South Bantoid) is a branch of the Bantoid language family. It consists of the Bantu languages along with several small branches and isolates of eastern Nigeria and west-central Cameroon (though the affiliation of some branches is uncertain). Since the Bantu languages are spoken across most of Sub-Saharan Africa, Southern Bantoid comprises 643 languages as counted by Ethnologue, though many of these are mutually intelligible.

History

Southern Bantoid was first introduced by Williamson in a proposal that divided Bantoid into North and South branches.

The unity of the North Bantoid group was subsequently called into question, and Bantoid itself may be polyphyletic, but the work did establish Southern Bantoid as a valid genetic unit, something that has not happened for (Narrow) Bantu itself.

Internal classification
According to Williamson and Blench, Southern Bantoid is divided into the various Narrow Bantu languages, Jarawan, Tivoid, Beboid, Mamfe (Nyang), Grassfields and Ekoid families. The Bendi languages are of uncertain classification; they have traditionally been classified with Cross River, but they may actually be Southern Bantoid. Blench suggests that Tivoid, Momo (ex-Grassfields) and East Beboid may form a group, perhaps with the uncertain languages Esimbi and Buru–Angwe:

? Bendi
 Tivoid–Beboid: Tivoid, Esimbi, East Beboid, ? Buru–Angwe, ? Menchum
West Beboid (geographic)
Furu
 Mamfe
 Ekoid–Mbe: Ekoid, Mbe
Grassfields: Ring, Eastern Grassfields (Mbam–Nkam), Momo, ? Ndemli, Southwest Grassfields (Western Momo), ? Ambele
Narrow Bantu, Jarawan–Mbam

Grollemund (2012)
Classification of Southern Bantoid by Grollemund (2012):

Numerals
Comparison of numerals in individual languages:

References

External links
ComparaLex, database with Southern Bantoid word lists